Isabella Gaspersz (born August 5, 2008), known professionally as Izzy G, is an American actress known for her work on AJ and the Queen and B Positive.

Early life and career 
Gaspersz is the daughter of actress Sabrina Gennarino and director Pieter Gaspersz. They are of Italian descent. Gaspersz appeared on Jimmy Kimmel Live! with guest host RuPaul in August 2021.

Filmography 
 After (2014) - Baby Chloe
 Death of an Umbrella Salesman (2018) - Mean Girl
 Wings (2018) - Little Girl
 The Highwaymen (2019) - Little Mudlark Girl
 A Violent Separation (2019) - Young Frances
 AJ and the Queen (2020) - AJ Douglas
 B Positive (2020–2022) - Madeline "Maddie" Dunbar
 Under the Bridge (TBA) - Kelly Ellard

References

External links 
 

2008 births
Living people
American child actresses
American people of Italian descent
21st-century American women